Visions Drama School is an Irish drama school and talent agency based in Temple Bar, Dublin.

The director of the school and acting instructor is Mary Murray, an Irish actress and acting coach.
She has worked on projects including Penny Dreadful, Love/Hate, The Magdalene Sisters, and Adam & Paul.

Notable people

Alumni
Hazel Doupe
Lauren Kinsella
Fionn O'Shea

References

External links
 
 

Drama schools in Ireland
Arts in Dublin (city)